The Oneida Dispatch originated as an independent printed newspaper. They're now part of a large newsgroup. The paper's print frequency has been reduced, and they've added an online news website, often referred to as Oneida Daily Dispatch. Their coverage goes beyond local and regional news.

History
The newspaper was founded in 1863 as Oneida Weekly Dispatch, becoming a daily named Oneida Dispatch shortly thereafter. In 1926 they began using the name Oneida Daily Dispatch, although they did not print a Sunday edition. The name Oneida Daily Dispatch
 now refers to three times per week; their print schedule is Tuesdays, Thursdays, and also Sundays.

They use material from their fellow family publications The Record, The Saratogian and The Daily Freeman. Their news is noted by other upstate New York newspapers; these also cite some of their scoops. Trade publications such as Adweek also cover them.

The newspaper's 2013 bankruptcy led to Alden Global Capital taking over Oneida's parent corporation.

References

External links
 Library of Congress information about the newspaper's founder's prior periodical (1854-1863)

MediaNews Group
Newspapers published in New York (state)